Testelt is a village in Belgium, part of the municipality Scherpenheuvel-Zichem. It has a population of 2,877 (2006 est.).

Former municipalities of Flemish Brabant